The London Array is a 175-turbine 630 MW Round 2 offshore wind farm located  off the Kent coast in the outer Thames Estuary in the United Kingdom. It was the largest offshore wind farm in the world until Walney Extension reached full production in September 2018.

Construction of phase 1 of the wind farm began in March 2011 and was completed by mid 2013, being formally inaugurated by the Prime Minister, David Cameron on 4 July 2013.

The second phase of the project was refused planning consent in 2014 due to concerns over the impact on sea birds.

Description
It is in the area between Long Sand and Kentish Knock, between Margate in Kent and Clacton in Essex. The site has water depths of no more than 25 m and is mostly away from deep water shipping lanes. It is north of the shallow cross estuary channel, the Fisherman's Gat and astride of the Foulger's Gat.

The first phase consisted of 175 Siemens Wind Power SWT-3.6 turbines and two offshore substations, giving a wind farm with a peak rated power of 630 MW. The two offshore substations are connected to an onshore substation at Cleve Hill (near Graveney) on the north Kent coast, by four 150 kV subsea export cables, in total . It is named after London because the power goes to the London grid.

The smaller Thanet Wind Farm is to the south.

The array is intended to reduce annual  emissions by about 900,000 tons, equal to the emissions of 300,000 passenger cars.

History
In 2001 environmental studies identified areas of the outer Thames Estuary as potential sites for offshore wind farms; the Department of Trade and Industry published the paper Future Offshore — A Strategic Framework for the Offshore Wind Industry, which identified the outer Thames Estuary as one of three potential areas for future wind farm development (Round 2 wind farms). The Crown Estate awarded a 50-year lease to London Array Ltd (a consortium of E.ON UK Renewables, Shell WindEnergy, and CORE Limited) in December 2003. A planning application was submitted in 2005, which was approved in December 2006. Planning permission for the onshore electricity substation was granted in November 2007.

In May 2008, Shell announced that it was pulling out of the project. It was announced in July 2008 that E.ON UK and DONG Energy would buy Shell's stake. Subsequently, on 16 October 2008, London Array announced the Abu Dhabi based Masdar would join E.ON as a joint venture party in the scheme. Under the agreement, Masdar purchased 40% of E.ON's half share of the scheme, giving Masdar a 20% stake in the project overall. The resultant ownership was 50% DONG Energy, 30% E.ON UK Renewables and 20% Masdar.

In March 2009, the backers agreed on an initial investment of €2.2 billion. Financing of phase 1 was achieved through the European Investment Bank and the Danish Export Credit Fund with £250 million.

In 2013, in response to  Ofgem "Offshore Transmission Owner" regulations, the consortium divested the electrical transmission assets of the wind farm (valued at £459 million) to Blue Transmission London Array Limited – an entity incorporated by Barclays Infrastructure Funds Management Limited (Barclays) and Diamond UK Transmission Corporation (a Mitsubishi Corporation subsidiary).

In January 2014, DONG sold half its stake to Quebec public pension plan manager  ("").

At the time of its construction it was the largest offshore wind farm in the world.

Construction and commissioning
Offshore work began in March 2011 with construction of the first foundation.

Turbines were supplied by Siemens Wind Power. Their foundations were built by a joint-venture between Per Aarsleff and Bilfinger Berger Ingenieurbau GmbH. The same company supplied and installed the monopiles. Generators were installed by MPI and A2SEA, using an installation vessel  and a jack-up barge Sea Worker. Two offshore substations were designed, fabricated and installed by Future Energy, a joint venture between Fabricom, Iemants and Geosea, while electrical systems and onshore substation work was undertaken by Siemens Transmission & Distribution. The subsea export cable was supplied by Nexans and array cables by JDR Cable Systems. The array cables and the export cables were installed by VSMC.

The wind farm started producing electricity at the end of October 2012. All 175 turbines of phase 1 were confirmed fully operational on 8 April 2013, and the wind farm was formally inaugurated by the Prime minister David Cameron on 4 July 2013. In December 2015 it produced 369 GWh, a monthly capacity factor of 78.9%. It produced 2.5 TWh in 2015. During two days of January 2016, production varied from 3 MW to 619 MW.

Its levelised cost has been estimated at £140/MWh.

Phase 2
A second phase was planned which would have seen a further 166 turbines installed to increase the capacity to 1000 MW. However, the second phase was scaled back and finally cancelled in February 2014 after concerns were raised by the Royal Society for the Protection of Birds about its effect on a local population of red-throated divers.

See also

List of offshore wind farms in the United Kingdom
List of offshore wind farms
List of offshore wind farms in the North Sea

References

Notes

Sources

External links

 

Wind farms in England
Buildings and structures in Kent
E.ON
Ørsted (company) wind farms
Offshore wind farms in the North Sea
Round 2 offshore wind farms
Thames Estuary
Energy infrastructure completed in 2013
2013 establishments in England